Drum Manor Forest Park is a forest in Northern Ireland, south of the Sperrin Mountains and west of Lough Neagh. It was bought from a private owner in 1964 and opened to the public in 1970.

See: Forests in the United Kingdom

External links
Homepage at the Forest Service

Forests and woodlands of Northern Ireland
Geography of County Tyrone
Protected areas of County Tyrone